Huntington may refer to:

 Huntingtown, Maryland
 Huntington, Maryland, former name of Bowie, Maryland